The Lexington County Museum is made up of 36 historic houses and outbuildings.  It showcases the Colonial and Antebellum period of Lexington County history, with a particular focus on the Swiss and German heritage of Lexington. It is located in the Historic District of Lexington, South Carolina and has a large collection of locally-made artifacts, including quilts, furniture, and pottery. A department of Lexington County government, the Museum was created in 1970.

Historical houses owned by the museum 
John Fox House
Ernest Hazelius House

External links
 Lexington County Museum website

Museums in Lexington County, South Carolina
Open-air museums in South Carolina
Ethnic museums in South Carolina
German-American history
German-American culture in South Carolina
Swiss-American culture in South Carolina
Historic house museums in South Carolina
Museums established in 1970
1970 establishments in South Carolina
European-American museums